Jeff Carmichael (born August 20, 1965 in Paterson, New Jersey), better known as Jay Supreme, is an American rapper and former co-lead artist of German Eurodance group Culture Beat.

Biography
Carmichael was born in Paterson, New Jersey. There, as a teenager, he formed his own rap group. He later went to Germany for his military duty serving in the U.S. Army in 1989. He left the army in 1991 to proceed with his music career.

With Culture Beat
Carmichael is best known for his rapping with the popular Eurodance group Culture Beat, such as on the song "No Deeper Meaning", with Lana Earl on vocals. Carmichael was already a rapper on early Culture Beat songs from 1990, when they released the singles "I Like You" and "Erdbeermund", but the most successful years with the group were 1993–1997, when they achieved worldwide hits with "Mr. Vain", Got to Get It, "Anything", "Inside Out", "World in Your Hands" and "Crying in the Rain".

Solo career and present status
In 1997, Carmichael and Tania Evans left Culture Beat to pursue solo careers. Carmichael started to work with the group Rappers Against Racism where he was featured on their two hits, "Sorry" and "Hiroshima (Fly Little Bird)". In the summer of 2000, he released his lone solo single, "Your Love (Encore)" which featured Cheryl Lynn. The song received airplay on European hip-hop/R&B radio stations. He is currently living in USA (New Jersey). In 2015 he officially left the music industry. He has a Facebook account (Jeff Culture Beat Carmichael) where he interacts with fans.

References

External links
T-Music www.euro-rap.com - full biography, discography, pics, videos, etc

1965 births
Living people
American rappers
21st-century American rappers